The 2018–19 season is the 36th season in Segunda División played by Real Oviedo, a Spanish football club based in Oviedo, Asturias. It covers a period from 1 July 2018 to 30 June 2019.

Players

Squad

Reserve team

In

Out

Technical Staff

Pre-season and friendlies

Competitions

Segunda División

Results summary

Result round by round

Matches

Copa del Rey

Second round

Statistics

Squad statistics
 

|-
|colspan="12"|Players who have left the club after the start of the season:

Disciplinary record

|-
|colspan=14 align=left|Players who have left the club after the start of the season:

References

External links 

Real Oviedo
Real Oviedo seasons